Baoguo Temple is a Buddhist temple located on Mount Emei, in Emeishan City, Sichuan, China. It is the site of the Buddhist Association of Mount Emei. The temple mainly enshrines Buddhist Bodhisattvas as well as sages of Confucianism and deities of Taoism, which makes unique temple of three spiritual traditions.

History
The temple traces its origins to the former Huizong Hall, founded by Mingguang in the Wanli period (1573–1619) of the Ming dynasty. During that time, the temple enshrines deities of the three religions with Samantabhadra Bodhisattva in the middle, Taoist deity Guangchengzi and Confucian sage Lu Tong on the left and right sides. This represents the prevailed idea of Three Teachings Harmonious as One in the Ming and Qing dynasties.

In the reign of Shunzhi Emperor in the Qing dynasty, monk Wenda moved the temple to the present site.

In 1703, in the Kangxi era, Kangxi Emperor named it "Baoguo Temple".

The temple was enlarged in 1866 by monk Guanghui.

Baoguo Temple was inscribed as a National Key Buddhist Temple in Han Chinese Area by the State Council of China in 1983.

Architecture

Now the existing main buildings include the Shanmen, Hall of Maitreya, Mahavira Hall, Seven Buddha Hall and Buddhist Texts Library.

Shanmen
Under the eaves is a plaque with the Chinese characters "Baoguo Temple" written by Kangxi Emperor and inscribed by calligrapher Wang Fan.

Hall of Maitreya
In the center of the hall enshrines the statue of Maitreya with Skanda standing at his back.

Mahavira Hall
The Mahavira Hall enshrining the Three Saints of Hua-yan. In the middle is Sakyamuni, statues of Manjushri and Samantabhadra stand on the left and right sides of Sakyamuni's statue. The statues of Eighteen Arhats sitting on the seats before both sides of the gable walls.

Seven Buddha Hall
Behind the Mahavira Hall is the Seven Buddha Hall enshrining the statues of Kassapa Buddha, Kakusandha Buddha, Sikhī Buddha, Vipassī Buddha, Vessabhū Buddha, Koṇāgamana Buddha and Sakyamuni Buddha.

At the back of the hall are statues of Guanyin and Mahasthamaprapta. Longnü and Shancai are placed on the left and right sides.

Hall of Samantabhadra
The Hall of Samantabhadra houses a statue of Samantabhadra on the back of white elephant.

Huayan Pagoda
The body is carved with Avatamsaka Sutra.

Bell
The bell was cast by Huizong Biechuan in 1564 in the late Ming dynasty. It sounds deep and sonorous when beaten. Outside of the bell cast over 60 thousand words of Āgama and other Buddhist scriptures.

References

Bibliography
 

Buddhist temples in Sichuan
Buildings and structures in Leshan
Tourist attractions in Leshan
16th-century establishments in China
16th-century Buddhist temples